The King's American Regiment, also known as the "Associated Refugees", were a Loyalist regiment during the American Revolutionary War.

The King's American Regiment was raised on Staten Island in the Province of New York in December 1776 by Colonel Edmund Fanning as the "Associated Refugees". It served in the 1777 attacks on Fort Clinton and Fort Montgomery, the Southern Campaign 1780–1781, the 1780 Siege of Charleston, the 1781 raids on Newport and Richmond, Virginia, and the 1781 Campaigns in Province of Georgia and East Florida.

The regiment was brought into the American Establishment, on March 7, 1781, and renamed the "4th American Regiment of Foot". The regiment later joined the British Regular Army, on December 25, 1782, possibly as the "110th Regiment of Foot", and was disbanded in British Canada in 1783.

References

External links 
 The Loyalist Collection, University of New Brunswick
 History of the King's American Regiment, Parts 1-8 - On-Line Institute for Advanced Loyalist Studies
 Picture of King's American Regiment private and officer

Loyalist military units in the American Revolution
Infantry regiments of the British Army